Sir Charles Archibald Nicholson, 2nd Baronet (27 April 1867 – 4 March 1949), was an English architect and designer who specialised in ecclesiastical buildings and war memorials. He carried out the refurbishments of several cathedrals, the design and build of over a dozen new churches, and the restoration of many existing, medieval parish churches.

Nicholson was born in Hadleigh, Essex to Sir Charles Nicholson, 1st Baronet, and his wife, Sarah Elizabeth Nicholson  Keightley. His younger brothers were the stained-glass artist Archibald Keightley Nicholson and Sir Sydney Hugo Nicholson, the founder of the Royal School of Church Music.

Nicholson was married first to Evelyn Louise Nicholson  Olivier (1866–1927) and they had three children, a son, John, and two daughters.  His second wife was Catherine Maud Warren, who survived him upon his death in 1949.

Early life
Nicholson was born in Hadleigh, Essex, to Sir Charles Nicholson, 1st Baronet, and his wife, Sarah Elizabeth Nicholson  Keightley. His younger brothers were the stained-glass artist Archibald Keightley Nicholson and Sir Sydney Hugo Nicholson, organist at Westminster Abbey and the founder of the Royal School of Church Music. Nicholson attended Rugby School and New College, Oxford, obtaining a third class in modern history in 1889. He took an interest in architecture and was apprenticed to the architect J. D. Sedding, under whom he learnt the Victorian Gothic style. He worked for a short time for Henry Wilson before founding his own practice in 1893. He won the Tite Prize in 1893 and was elected a fellow of the Royal Institute of British Architects in 1905. Hubert Corlette later partnered him until 1916. From 1920 Nicholson worked with Theodore Rushton.

Career
In addition to designing churches, Nicholson conducted the refurbishments of many medieval churches. In addition to his ecclesiastical commissions, he was also a prolific designer of public war memorials, including one at his former school in Rugby. Nicholson's Anglican cathedral work included a new east chapel in Norwich, the west front of St Anne's Cathedral, Belfast (where he was the cathedral's architect between 1924–48) various additions to Chelmsford Cathedral, and the reconstruction of Portsmouth Cathedral. His internal restorations were carried out at Brecon, Carlisle, Exeter, Leicester, Lichfield, Lincoln, Llandaff, Manchester, Salisbury, Wakefield, Wells, and Winchester. His works abroad include the ministerial buildings for the Jamaican Government in Kingston.

Nicholson's works include 42 new churches, nine new chapels, and work on nine cathedrals. Nicholson took on the alterations and restorations of many medieval churches, together with the designs of a large amount of church furnishings. The majority of his work was in England, but he also worked in Wales, Northern Ireland, Jamaica and South Africa. He was also an accomplished watercolourist who exhibited at the Royal Academy on 32 occasions.

From 1890, Nicholson carried out a lot of restoration work to his local parish church, St Mary the Virgin in South Benfleet. He designed the reredos between 1890–91, completely restored the south aisle between 1924-5, and designed much of the building's furnishings and fittings. His gilded border, which he completed in 1935, incorporated previous paintings by his mother, Sarah. These were repainted in 1958. Barbara Nicholson, one of his daughters, painted the ciborium.

Personal life
Nicholson succeeded to the baronetcy in 1903. He largely avoided publicity and preferred to conduct a quiet life with his family.

Nicholson was married twice: firstly, on 1 October 1895, to Evelyn Louise Nicholson  Olivier (1867–1927), daughter of the Reverend Henry Arnold Olivier, and sister of Sydney Haldane Olivier (1859–1943), and aunt of Laurence Olivier. Born on the Isle of Wight, Evelyn was a diarist and watercolour painter. During the voyages to and from Australia, Nicholson kept a diary in which she described the places, the people and the flora and fauna which she encountered. She and her husband made many watercolour sketches of the scenery along the way, including seascapes, landscapes and buildings. Highlights of the trip were a visit to Sydney University and a coastal voyage from Sydney to Rockhampton, Queensland, and return. At the university they visited the Nicholson Museum, named after Sir Charles Nicholson, 1st Baronet. The diary and the book of sketches were bequeathed to Sydney University in 1988 by her son, Sir John Nicholson, 3rd Baronet, together with the book of paintings. The Nicholsons had a son, John Charles (b. 1904) and two daughters.

On 10 June 1931, four years after Evelyn's death, Nicolson married Catherine Maud Warren (1883–1962) at the Church of All Saints, Southend-on-sea, Essex.

Nicholson died on 4 March 1949 in Oxford and is buried in the Church of St Mary the Virgin, South Benfleet. He is buried, alongside his first wife, in a stone memorial he designed for her, on the south side of the west tower. His second wife was buried there upon her death in 1962. The tomb was designated as a Grade II listed building on 9 November 2021 by Historic England.

Partial list of works
Nicholson's architectural works include:
St Andrew's Vicarage (now renamed Church End House), Totteridge, Hertfordshire (1892, Nicholson's first work)
Enlargement of St Matthew's Church, Yiewsley, Middlesex (1897-1898)
St Alban the Martyr, Westcliff-on-Sea, Essex (1898-1908)
Chancel fittings for Christ Church, Chester (1900–10)
Remodelling of Burton Manor, Cheshire (1902)
Enlargement of Clifton College Chapel, Bristol (1909–10)
Major alterations to St Oswald's Church, Guiseley, West Yorkshire (1910 etc.)
Chernockehouse, Winchester, Hampshire (1910–12)
St Luke's Church, Grimsby, Lincolnshire (1912)
St Paul's Church, Halifax, West Yorkshire (1912)
Restoration of All Saints' Church, Cadney, Lincolnshire (1912–14)
New nave and chancel of St Lawrence's Church, Scunthorpe, Lincolnshire (1913)
 St John the Divine, Rastrick, West Yorkshire (1913)
 St Clement's Church, Leigh-on-Sea, Essex (1913 and 1919)
St Alban's church, Copnor, Hampshire (1914)
St Michael's Church, Sutton Ings, East Riding of Yorkshire (1915)
War memorial for St John's Church, Coleford, Gloucestershire (1918)
Sotterley War Memorial, Suffolk (1920)
North chapel of St Michael's Church, Basingstoke, Hampshire (1920)
Chapel of the Resurrection and vestries for St James' Church, Grimsby, Lincolnshire (1920)
Restoration of St Giles' Church, Oxford (1920)
Enlargement of SS Philip and James' Church, Oxford (1920–21)
Hornchurch war memorial, Essex (1921)
Memorial Chapel of Rugby School, Warwickshire (1920)
Church of St John the Evangelist, Long Eaton, Derbyshire (started 1922)
Screen in the Church of St Mary the Virgin, Saffron Walden, Essex (1924)
Church of the Ascension, Bitterne Park, Hampshire (1924–26)
Our Lady of Lourdes and St Joseph, Leigh-on-Sea, Essex (1924-1929), based on original designs for St Alban's Westcliff-on-Sea
St Dunstan's Church, Bellingham Estate, Lewisham (1925)
Completion of Christ Church, Gosport, Hampshire (1925)
Restoration of Shrewsbury Castle, Shropshire (1926)
Completion of St Matthew's Church, Southsea, Hampshire (1926, now the Church of the Holy Spirit)
Chelmsford Cathedral: new east end (1926) and bishop's throne
Chancel screen of the Church of St Margaret, Bowers Gifford, Essex (1926)
St Mary's church, Bournemouth (1926–34)
St Michael and All Angels, Leigh-on-Sea, Essex (started 1926, completed after his death 1957)
Chapel and library for St Boniface College, Warminster, Wiltshire (1927)
Bishop's throne and stalls for Leicester Cathedral (1927)
St Michael's Church, Castleford, West Yorkshire (1927–29)
Altar and reredos of the Church of St Mary and St Cuthbert, Chester-le-Street, County Durham (1928)
St John's Church, Stafford (started 1928, uncompleted)
Enlargement of Church of St Laurence, Upminster, Essex (1928)
New St Mary's Church, Frinton-on-Sea, Essex (1928–29)
Restoration of St Mary's Church, Hamstead Marshall, Berkshire (1929)
St Andrew's Church, Bromley (1929)
West doors of St Anne’s Cathedral, Belfast (1929)
Stained glass east window for the Horner Chapel of St Andrew's Church, Mells, Somerset (1930)
Seamen's home at Alton, Hampshire (1929–36)
Restoration of Christ Church, Gosport, Hampshire (1930s)
Lady Chapel of Norwich Cathedral (1930–32)
St George's Church, Barkingside, Essex (1931)
Rebuilding parts of SS Peter and Paul's Church, Fareham, Hampshire (1931–32)
St John's Church, Dudley Wood, Staffordshire (now West Midlands, 1931)
St Margaret's Church, Leigh-on-Sea, Essex (1931)
St Peter's Church, St Helier, London (1932)
Reredos and choir stalls of St Petroc's Church, Bodmin, Cornwall (1932)
St Elizabeth's Church, Becontree, Essex (1932)
Refurbishment of St Sepulchre-without-Newgate, London, 1932
Residential block at Malling Abbey, Kent (1935)
Screen of the north chapel of St Mary's Church, Droxford, Hampshire (1935)
Sheffield Cathedral enlargement (1936) and bishop's throne (1937)
St Thomas of Canterbury's Church, Camelford, Cornwall (1938)
Enlargement of Portsmouth Cathedral (1938–39), Hampshire
Restoration of Wakefield Cathedral (1939)
Reredos in Lady Chapel of the Church of St Saviour-on-the-Cliff, Shanklin (1948)
Monument to FH Lindley Meynell in Holy Angels Church, Hoar Cross, Staffordshire (1941)
Roof decoration for St Mary's Church, Ketton, Rutland (completed in 1950 after his death)
The roof of Alton Abbey, Hampshire
Nave altar and railings for Lincoln Cathedral
Altar, reredos and communion rails for St Michael's Church, Macclesfield, Cheshire
Font cover for St Chad's Church, Stafford
Pulpit for St Michael's Church, Stone, Staffordshire
Grange Mansions, Totteridge, Hertfordshire
Furnishings for the Essex Regiment Chapel at Warley Barracks, Little Warley, Essex
The pulpit of St Andrew's Church, West Chelborough, Dorset
Southend War Memorial, Essex
Mosaic design for the Church of SS Mary and Nicholas, Wilton, Wiltshire
Reredos for All Saints' Church, Wolverhampton
Burwash War Memorial, East Sussex
Havant War Memorial, Hampshire (jointly with Alfred Edwin Stallard)
Stained glass window of St Michael and St George First World War memorial, St Mary Magdalene, Sparkford, Somerset

Citations

References and further reading

 

Evelyn Nicholson’s trip to Australia, 1897, University of Sydney Library

External links 

 Diary of a Honeymoon Trip to Australia in 1897

People educated at Rugby School
Alumni of New College, Oxford
1867 births
1949 deaths
Baronets in the Baronetage of the United Kingdom
Architects from Essex
20th-century English architects